Paolo Andrea Di Pietro (born November 8, 1986), better known mononymously in Japan as , is an Italian singer and actor living and working in Japan (Gaikokujin tarento). He has appeared in a variety of Japanese commercials, TV shows and films. He also lent his singing voice to anime and video game soundtracks of internationally known franchises such as Dragon Quest and Final Fantasy.

Filmography

Film

TV Drama

Anime

Video Games

Music Videos

References

External links 
 

1986 births
Expatriate television personalities in Japan
Italian expatriates in Japan
Italian male actors
Italian male singers
Living people
Operatic basses